Jacqueline ("Jacqui") Cheer QPM is a former senior police officer in the United Kingdom. She was the Chief Constable of Cleveland Police until retiring from the Police Service in March 2016.

Education
Cheer studied at Fitzwilliam College, Cambridge.

Early career
Cheer joined Essex Police in 1984.  In 2004 she attended a Strategic Command Course, and transferred to Suffolk Police as an Assistant Chief Constable in 2006.  She was promoted to Deputy Chief Constable with Suffolk.

Career with Cleveland Police
Cheer was appointed Chief Constable of Cleveland Police on a permanent basis by the force's Police and Crime Commissioner, Barry Coppinger, in February 2013. She was appointed temporary chief in late 2011, following the suspension and subsequent sacking of her predecessor, Sean Price, and his deputy, Derek Bonnard.

From January to March 2015, Cheer was seconded as an instructor to the London Police College.

Honors and awards
She was awarded the Queen's Police Medal in the 2012 New Year Honours.

References

Living people
Alumni of Fitzwilliam College, Cambridge
British Chief Constables
English recipients of the Queen's Police Medal
British women police officers
Year of birth missing (living people)